Bambleshwari Temple is at Dongargarh in Rajnandgaon district, Chhattisgarh, India. It is on a hilltop of 1600 feet. This temple is referred as Badi Bambleshwari. Another temple at ground level, the Chhotti Bambleshwari is situated about 1/2 km from the main temple complex. These temples are revered by lakhs of people of Chhattisgarh who flock around  the shrine during the Navratris of Kavar (during Dusshera) and Chaitra (during Ram Navami).  There is tradition of lighting Jyoti Kalash during Navaratris here.

Location
Dongargarh is 107 kilometers from Raipur, via Bhilai, Durg and Rajnandgaon. Dongargarh does not exactly fall on the massive Mumbai highway, a diversion some 25  km before, from the Calcutta-Calcutta-Mumbai National Highway (NH #6) leads the vehicle through lush green vegetation and mild forests on a narrow winding single road.

Dongargarh is 40  km from district headquarters Rajnandgaon and is well connected with buses from Rajnandgaon. Dongargarh as well as trains. It is on the Mumbai - Howrah main line at a distance of 200 km from Nagpur and 100 km from Raipur. The nearest airport is at Raipur Airport.

The rope-way in the hill on which the temple is located, is another attraction to the tourists in the city. It is very popular with the tourists as it is the only rope-way that has been set up in Chhattisgarh state.

Legend

Dongar means mountains in Marathi Language while Garh means fort. The legend goes that around 2200 years ago, Raja Veersen, a local king, was childless and upon the suggestions of his royal priests performed puja to the gods. Within a year, the queen gave birth to a son whom they named Madansen. Raja Veersen considered this a blessing of Lord Shiva and Parvati and constructed a temple here..In the temple of Dongargarh, king Vikramaditya went to commit suicide but Devi Bamleshwari appeared and stopped him from doing it.
For reaching the top, there are total 1000 steps that lead to the temple.

Ropeway accident 
On 29 February 2016 in a ropeway mishap, a woman was killed and three others were injured. On 18 February 2021, a labourer died in a similar accident.

Online facilities
"The temple provides the facility of Online Ropeway Ticket Booking and Online Jyoti Kalash Booking

 Live Darshan (Video streaming) of Both Temples
 Online Booking Portal for Ropeway Tickets and Jyotikalash

See also
 List of Hindu temples in India

Gallery

References

External links
 Official Website of Bamleshwari Temple
 Tours to Rajnandgaon 
google+ - bambleshwari temple

Hindu temples in Chhattisgarh
Hindu pilgrimage sites in India
Rajnandgaon district
Rajnandgaon